New Page can refer to:

New Page (album), an album by F.T. Island
New Page, former name of rock band Tabú Tek
New Page Books, a division of Red Wheel/Weiser/Conari
NewPage, a papermaking company